The R709 is a Regional Route in Free State, South Africa that connects Winburg with Hobhouse via Excelsior and Tweespruit.

Route
Its northern terminus is a junction with the N5 and the R708 north of Winburg. From here, it runs south through the Winburg town centre before leaving the town. The first town it passes through is Excelsior, where it meets the R703 at a staggered intersection. Continuing south, it passes through Tweespruit, then crosses the N8. The route ends at Hobhouse, at a junction with the R26.

References 

Regional Routes in the Free State (province)